Hideaways is a fantasy thriller film directed by Agnès Merlet and written by Nick Murphy. It stars Rachel Hurd-Wood and Harry Treadaway. The film is a French/Irish/Swedish co-production.

Plot
James Furlong is the last in a long line of Furlongs who were each blessed or cursed with a strange ability. His grandfather, Charlie went temporarily blind when he thought about sex. His father, Philip could turn off anything electrical when he was frightened. From the moment of his violent birth, involving the death of his mother, his life seems ill-fated, but it is unclear what kind of ability, if any, he possesses. Growing up in rural Ireland, his grandmother tells him about the strange quirks of his ancestors and the boy begins to experiment on himself, longing to discover some extraordinary, hidden power. But instead, his experiments lead to the death of his family's livestock, followed swiftly by the loss of Philip and his beloved grandmother, Charlotte. By the time he is ten years old, James is the sole survivor of the Furlong family.

James is sent to St. Judes reformatory, but does not adjust easily to life there. Having been home-schooled on the farm, he is not equipped with the necessary social skills or abilities on the sports-field. He is bullied by the other boys, especially Kevin and Stephen. His only friend is Liam, the only one who shows him any kindness. His powers then kill the hurling Coach's vicious dog Tinkerbell. The principal, Mrs. Moore, suspects Kevin because of his smug attitude. Kevin and Stephen attack James, for getting Kevin into trouble. A mysterious illness then sweeps through the reformatory, killing everyone except James and Liam, who flees and suffers only lung problems. In the chaos that ensues, he finally begins to comprehend the dark, destructive nature of his powers, and at the first opportunity he goes into hiding.

Years later, he is discovered by a young woman, living out a lonely existence completely isolated from society. Mae (named after actress Mae West) has run away from hospital where she is being treated for cancer and comes across James's cottage deep in the woods by chance. Initially, he is reluctant to have anything to do with her, fearful of harming her, but Mae has already resigned herself to her fate and is afraid of very little – certainly not of James with his gentle nature, and childlike innocence. Even when she learns his story, she is unafraid, and urges him to leave the cottage and his lonely life behind. Mae wants to savour all the time she has left in the world and hates to see someone so loving and compassionate isolated from it and denying himself everything that life has to offer.

They soon fall in love, but Mae returns to the hospital soon after. James visits her, where they consummate their love. Soon after, James bumps into Liam, the sole survivor from the reformatory. In the final climactic scenes, Liam confronts James with the destruction of his past, and kills him with a pair of scissors, before running away. James' strange powers had cured everyone in the hospital and stopped Mae's death. The film ends six years later with Mae telling their six-year-old daughter, Diana (named after singer Diana Ross) about James.

Cast
 Rachel Hurd-Wood as Mae-West O'Mara
 Harry Treadaway as James Furlong
 James Wilson as James Furlong (10)
 Thomas Brodie-Sangster as Liam
 Susan Lynch as Mrs O'Mara
 Stuart Graham as Sergeant
 Aaron Monaghan as Philip Furlong
 Diarmuid O'Dwyer as Liam (11)
 Craig Connolly as Kevin
 Patrick Behan as Jimmy
 Calem Martin as Stephen
 Chris Johnston as Bully
 Shane Curry as Bully 3
 Kate O'Toole as Mrs. Moore
 Bern Deegan as Charlie Furlong (32)
 Mairead Reynolds as Charlotte Furlong (28)
 Holly Gregg as Laura
 Niamh Shaw as Night Nurse
 Tom Collins as Mr. Boyle
 Brianna O' Driscoll as Diana-Ross Furlong-O'Mara
 Callum Maloney as Philip Furlong (5)
 Joe Dermody as Coach Hanley

Production
Principal photography began on 10 May 2010 in Ireland. Filming took place on location in Wicklow and Meath. Filming was scheduled to last two months, but completion of principal photography was delayed as a result of Hurd-Wood becoming ill. Filming locations included Ballygarth Castle in Julianstown, Meath and Shanganagh Castle in Shankill, Dublin. The film was originally called The Last Furlong but was changed to Hideaways. It premiered in the 2011 Tribeca Film Festival.

References

External links
 

2011 films
Irish fantasy films
French fantasy films
Swedish fantasy films
English-language Irish films
English-language French films
English-language Swedish films
Films shot in the Republic of Ireland
Films directed by Agnès Merlet
Films set in Ireland
2010s English-language films
2010s French films
2010s Swedish films